Luis Fernando Alday  is presently Rouse Ball Professor of Mathematics at the University of Oxford and Head of the Mathematical Physics Group.

His research interests are bootstrap approach to conformal field theories and string theory, several aspects of the AdS/CFT duality, four-dimensional N=2 super-symmetric theories and their relation to conformal field theories and exact computation of observables in super-symmetric gauge theories.

Alday was elected a Fellow of the Royal Society in May 2022.

References

External links
 Luis Alday

Living people
Year of birth missing (living people)
Fellows of the Royal Society
British mathematicians

Rouse Ball Professors of Mathematics (University of Oxford)
British string theorists